The Bala Fault is a SW-NE trending geological fault in Wales that extends offshore into Cardigan Bay. Onshore it is responsible for the lineament which runs through Bala and south of Cadair Idris to the coast at Tywyn. At its northeastern end it links to the similarly orientated Llanelidan Fault.

The fault is believed to have had two separate stages of movement. The horizons between the upper Carboniferous sequence and the underlying Jurassic sequence are parallel, so little rotational movement occurred. The second stage of movement happened in the middle-to-late Jurassic period, when strong rotation happened, up to 24 degrees.

See also
List of geological faults of Wales

References

Geology of Wales
Cardigan Bay